Robert Chesley Osborn (1904–1994) was an American satiric cartoonist, illustrator and author.

Pre-World War II career
Osborn was born October 26, 1904, in Oshkosh, Wisconsin. He witnessed a fatal  aviation crash in June 1916 of Charles Franklin Niles. He entered the University of Wisconsin in 1923, then transferred to Yale in 1923. At Yale, together with Dwight Macdonald, Wilder Hobson, Geoffrey T. Hellman, and Jack Jessup, Osborn helped publish campus humor magazine The Yale Record and was accepted into Yale's Elizabethan Club.

After graduating from Yale in 1928, he studied painting in Rome and Paris, then returned to the U.S. and began teaching art and philosophy at the Hotchkiss School in Lakeville, Conn. He found breaking into the ranks of serious artists difficult, and he soon turned to caricature, sometime after suffering from a perforated ulcer while at his fifth year of teaching at The Hotchkiss School.

Osborn was in Austria in 1938, working as a tutor, when he was taken to a Hitler rally. His reaction to this event prefigured his famous disgust with mindless obedience and obeisance: "I was sickened and convinced that before us was a demon," he wrote. War seemed to him acceptable, "if that was the only way to rid the world of his evil.". He attempted to join the Spanish Republicans to fight Franco, and later applied to the Royal Canadian Air Force, being turned down on both occasions because of his chronic duodenal ulcer.

World War II

The Dilbert years
 
Osborn enlisted when World War II began, hoping to become a U.S. Navy pilot. However, the Navy apparently decided that he would be better employed with his hand wrapped around a pen rather than around a joystick: he was soon learning, then applying the art of "speed drawing", under the command of the photographer Edward Steichen in a special information unit in which pilot training manuals were produced. Osborn began drawing cartoons of a pilot who was hapless, arrogant, ignorant and perpetually blundering in ways that put himself and his crew at unnecessary risk. The name of this character was Dilbert Groundloop also known as "Dilbert the Pilot" and "Dilbert" was soon to become a slang term used to refer to "sailor who is a foul-up or a screwball." Scott Adams credits Osborn as an indirect source of inspiration for the main character in his own Dilbert cartoons. It is not certain how many drawings Osborn produced for Navy manuals; estimates range from 2,000 to 40,000. Osborn illustrated an estimated 2,000 educational posters for Navy pilots between 1942 and the end of the war, some of which appeared in the New York Times and Life magazine. For a while, "dilbert" became a synonym for "blunder" for Navy pilots. In 1943, Dilbert was played by actor Huntz Hall in a US Navy training film Don't Kill your Friends.

Grampaw Pettibone
During the Second World War Osborn also drew cartoons of an experienced but somewhat curmudgeonly old Navy pilot, Grampaw Pettibone.  Known as the "Sage of Safety", this long-bearded ancient was created in 1943 to educate Navy pilots in safety following a series of avoidable flying mishaps.  Osborn illustrated the feature in Naval Aviation News for over 51 years, from 1943 until 1994, when artist Ted Wilbur took over.

Postwar career
After Osborn's stint in the Navy ended in 1946, he wrote a book called War is No Damn Good!, including a nightmarish skull-like depiction of an atomic bomb's mushroom cloud drawn only two weeks after Hiroshima, which prompted critic Steve Heller to call it "the first antiwar book of the nuclear age." The title alluded to cartoonist William Steig's caption, "People are no damn good."
Osborn later produced political cartoons, ridiculing Senator Joseph McCarthy, and a number of presidents, from Lyndon Baines Johnson through Ronald Reagan. His cartoons for magazines were frequently published in The New Republic, and also appeared in Fortune, Harper's, Life, Look, Esquire, and House & Garden. He was a political activist for a number of causes, including nuclear disarmament.

Critical reception
According to Osborn's New York Times obituary, over his 50-year career, Osborn's

sardonic and often savage drawings in books and magazines have arrested readers with their images of bloated power, violence and death. At the same time, he could be wittily ironic about society's pretensions, spoofing subjects like psychiatry, suburbanites and social climbing.

Osborn characterized himself as "a drawer" whose figures "seemed to come right out of my subconscious." Garry Trudeau called him "one of the very few masters of illustrative cartooning." Robert Motherwell wrote that his drawings were "so alive that they seemed to writhe on the page with an uninhibited energy .... Osborn's art is a call to responsible action."; Motherwell was among those who compared Osborn's graphic work to that of Daumier, Goya, Saul Steinberg, as well as to the sculpture of Alexander Calder, who was a friend of Osborn's.

Reviewing that show in The New York Times, Times art critic John Russell wrote of Osborn's exhibited Chaplin drawings that
Few people have a nimbler, wittier or more versatile way with pen and pencil than Robert Osborn.

Later life
From 1947 until his death, Osborn lived in Salisbury, Conn. with his wife, Elodie (maiden name Courter), an artist and curator with the Museum of Modern Art. He died of bone cancer, and was survived by two sons, Nic, a naturalist and photographer, and Eliot, a musician and teacher, both of Taconic, Connecticut.

Books written
 How to Shoot Ducks (1939)
 How to Shoot Quail (1939)
 How to Catch Trout (1939)
 How to Ski (1942)
 Aye, Aye, Sir! (1943)
 Dilbert: Just an Accident Looking for a Place to Happen! (1943)
 War is No Damn Good! (1946)
 How to Work for Peace (1948), with Fred Smith
 How to Play Golf (1949)
 Low & Inside (1953)
 How to Shoot Pheasant (1955)
 Osborn on Leisure (1957)
 The Vulgarians (1960)
 Dying to Smoke (1964) with Fred W. Benton, MD
 Mankind May Never Make It! (1968)
 An Osborn Festival of Phobias (1971), with Eve Wengler
  Osborn on Osborn (1982) (autobiography)
 Osborn on Conflict: 40 Brush Drawings (1984) Introduction by Robert Motherwell
 The Best of Gramps (1996) (posthumous), ed. by Association of Naval Aviation

Books illustrated
 If You Want to Build a House, Elizabeth Baur Kassler (Elizabeth B. Mock), Museum of Modern Art, 1946
 Safe for Solo: What Every Young Aviator Should Know, Frederick M. Reeder, Rear Adm USN (Ret.), 1947
 Acres and Pains, S.J. Perelman, 1947
 Snobs: a guidebook to your friends, your enemies, your colleagues and yourself, Russell Lynes, 1950
 Strategy in Poker, Business and War, John McDonald, 1950. (McDonald was the ghostwriter for Alfred P. Sloan's My Years with General Motors. McDonald probably came to Sloan's attention because of this strategy book; see Alfred P. Sloan: Critical Evaluations in Business and Management, John Cunningham Wood, Michael C. Wood, p. 91)
 Is Anybody Listening? How and why U. S. Business Fumbles when it Talks with Human Beings, William H. Whyte, 1952
 The Wonderful World of Books, Alfred Stefferud, 1953
 Trial by Television and Other Encounters, Michael Whitney Straight, 1954
  The Spoor of Spooks, and Other Nonsense, Bergen Evans, 1954
 Architecturally Speaking, Eugene Raskin, 1954
 The Exurbanites, A. C. Spectorsky, 1955
 Women & Children First, Paul Steiner, 1955
 Parkinson's Law, and Other Studies in Administration, C. Northcote Parkinson, 1957
 The Insolent Chariots, John Keats, 1958
 The Decline of the American Male, editors of Look, 1958
 Subverse: Rhymes for Our Times, Marya Mannes (AKA "Sec"), 1959
 Don't Get Perconel with a Chicken, H. Allen Smith, 1959
  The Law and Profits, C. Northcote Parkinson, 1960
  I Met a Man, John Ciardi, 1961
  A Modern Demonology, Frank Getlein, 1961
 Basics: An I-Can-Read Book for Grownups, Eve Merriam, 1962
 The Everlasting Cocktail Party: A Layman's Guide to Culture Climbing, Peter Blake, 1964
 The Song of Paul Bunyan & Tony Beaver, Ennis Rees, 1964
 Great Science Riddles, Rose Wyler, 1965
 Gardens Make Me Laugh, James Rose, 1965
 Computers on Campus: A Report to the President on their Use and Management, John Caffrey, American Council on Education, 1967
  Mrs. Parkinson's Law: And Other Studies in Domestic Science, C. Northcote Parkinson, 1968
 Not So Rich as You Think, George R. Stewart, 1968
 International Conflict for Beginners, Roger Fisher, 1969 (foreword by Edward M. Kennedy)
 Missile Madness, Herbert Scoville, 1970
 The Nixon Watch, John Osborne, 1970

Exhibitions
 Charles Chaplin, 1987

Archives and collections
 Robert Osborn Papers. Yale Collection of American Literature, Beinecke Rare Book and Manuscript Library.
 The Library of Congress
 The Pritzker Military Museum & Library
 The Smithsonian Institution

Notes

Further reading
 Ask a Flight Instructor website collection of 600 Osborn wartime drawings
 "Robert Osborn (1904-1995), a blog entry with many Osborn covers, cartoons and illustrations

1904 births
1994 deaths
The Yale Record alumni
Articles containing video clips
20th-century American writers
20th-century American artists